The Imamzadeh Hossein (also Emamzadeh-ye Hossein, Persian:  مسجد جامع عتيق قزوین) is the grave mosque of Imamazadeh Husayn, son of the 8th Imam Ali al-Rida ("Hazrat-e Reza") in Qazvin, Iran that the Safavids - Shah Tahmasp I built in the mid-16th century as a pilgrimage center.

History
The namesake of the tomb is the biennial deceased son of Imam Ali al-Rida. This passed in transit with his father to Khorasan in Qazvin in 821 and was buried at the site. Later more people were buried from the Safavid dynasty bib. Tahmasp I, who had his seat of government in Qazvin, built the tomb. His daughter Zeynab Begum expanded it in 1630, as is testified by a tile inscription.

Architecture
The tomb is reminiscent of a generous palace complex with its own walled garden, plant rows, small Iwanen, niches, grave stones and precious blue and cream-colored tile decorations. The facade of the main gate is of six ornamental minarets surmounted. Is the main gate by steps, there is a large courtyard opens. Directly behind the gate is a pavilion-like, octagonal fountain house.

The tomb is covered by a blue-yellow tiled dome. The central portion of the building is decorated with numerous mirror mosaics; the mirror mosaics of the vestibule and the tiles of the facades date from the 19th century. In this middle part carried by slender columns porch leads to areas segregated by sex and has two entrances; left for women, right for men. The building may only be entered without shoes. Tschadorpflicht From the vestibule the shrine can be reached. The interior of the shrine is decorated with mirrors, crystals and ornate chandeliers.

See also
Iranian architecture
History of Iran

References

Mosques in Iran
Qazvin
Mosque buildings with domes
National works of Iran
16th-century mosques